The 1994–95 Football League season was Birmingham City Football Club's 92nd in the Football League and their fourth in the third tier of English football, Division Two, to which they were relegated in 1993–94. They finished in first position in the 24-team division, so were promoted straight back to Division One for 1995–96. They entered the 1994–95 FA Cup in the first round, losing in the third round to Premier League club Liverpool in a penalty shootout in which they failed to convert a single penalty. They entered the League Cup in the first round and lost to Blackburn Rovers in the second. They won the Football League Trophy for the second time in four attempts, defeating Carlisle United at Wembley in front of a crowd of 76,663 with the first golden goal to determine a major English competition.

The club's top scorer was Steve Claridge with 20 league goals and 25 in all competitions. Goalkeeper Ian Bennett missed only one match of the 63 played in all competitions, the first round of the Football League Trophy, in which his replacement Ryan Price made his only competitive first-team appearance for Birmingham.

Football League Division Two

Match details

League table (part)

Note that goals scored took precedence over goal difference as a tiebreaker in the Football League.

Results summary

FA Cup

 Played at St Andrew's, Birmingham

League Cup

Football League Trophy

Appearances and goals

Numbers in parentheses denote appearances as substitute.
Players with name struck through and marked  left the club during the playing season.
Players with names in italics and marked * were on loan from another club for the whole of their season with Birmingham.

See also
Birmingham City F.C. seasons

References
General
 
 
 Source for match dates, league positions and results: 
 Source for lineups, appearances, goalscorers and attendances: Matthews (2010), Complete Record, pp. 424–25, 481.

Specific

Birmingham City F.C. seasons
Birmingham City